Hexura is a genus of American folding trapdoor spiders that was first described by Eugène Louis Simon in 1884.  it contains two species, found in the United States: H. picea and H. rothi. Originally placed with Mecicobothriidae, it was moved to Antrodiaetidae in 2019.

See also
 List of Antrodiaetidae species

References

Antrodiaetidae
Mygalomorphae genera
Spiders of the United States
Spiders of Canada